Pipestela hooperi is a species of sponge belonging to the family Axinellidae. 

The species was first described in 1996 by Rob van Soest and others as Cymbastela hooperi from a specimen collected from Kelso Reef in the  Great Barrier Reef. The species epithet, hooperi, honours John Hooper.

References

Axinellidae
Sponge genera
Taxa described in 1996
Taxa named by Rob van Soest